Desirae Krawczyk and Demi Schuurs defeated Coco Gauff and Zhang Shuai in the final, 6–3, 6–4 to win the doubles tennis title at the 2022 Women's Stuttgart Open.

Ashleigh Barty and Jennifer Brady were the reigning champions,  but they chose not to participate. Barty announced her retirement from professional tennis in March 2022.

Seeds

Draw

Draw

References

External links
 Main draw

Porsche Tennis Grand Prix - Doubles
2022 Doubles